Ettrick may refer to:

Places

Australia
Ettrick, New South Wales, administered by Kyogle Council
Ettrick, South Australia, a locality in the Rural City of Murray Bridge
Ettrick Station, pastoral lease and former sheep station in northwest Western Australia

Canada
Ettrick, Ontario, Canada, a community in Middlesex Centre

New Zealand
Ettrick, New Zealand, in Otago

Scotland
Ettrick, Scotland, in the Scottish Borders
Ettrick Water, a river in Ettrick
Ettrick Bay, a coastal bay on the west coast of the Isle of Bute
Ettrick Forest, a Royal forest that covered broad swathes of the Scottish Borders
Ettrick, Roxburgh and Berwickshire (Scottish Parliament constituency)
Ettrick and Lauderdale, a local government districts in the Borders region from 1975 to 1996
Loch Ettrick, a body of water in the Southern Uplands

United States
Ettrick, Virginia
Ettrick (town), Wisconsin
Ettrick (village), Wisconsin, the village in the town of Ettrick

Ships 
 , four different ships of the Royal Navy
 , a British ship that was part of Operation Aerial in June 1940, sunk in August 1942

Aircraft
 Ettrick, an Armstrong Whitworth Ensign aircraft

Other uses
Baron Ettrick, a title  in the Peerage of the United Kingdom

See also
Ettrich (disambiguation)